Aethiothemis solitaria is a species of dragonfly in the family Libellulidae. It is found in Angola, Botswana, Guinea, Guinea-Bissau, Namibia, Nigeria, Sierra Leone, Togo, Uganda, Zambia, possibly Malawi, and possibly Tanzania. Its natural habitats are subtropical or tropical moist lowland forests, dry savanna, moist savanna, subtropical or tropical dry shrubland, subtropical or tropical moist shrubland, swamps, and marshes.

References

 

Libellulidae
Odonata of Africa
Insects described in 1908
Taxonomy articles created by Polbot